Klich is a surname derived from the diminutive form of the given name  Kliment (Clement). It may refer to:

 Bogdan Klich (born 1960), Polish politician
 Kacper Klich (born 1994), Polish swimmer
 Kent Klich (born 1952), Swedish photographer
 Mateusz Klich (born 1990), Polish footballer
 Maciej Klich (born 1958), Polish historian

See also

References

Polish-language surnames